Mount St Mary's College is an independent, co-educational, day and boarding school situated at Spinkhill, Derbyshire, England. It was founded in 1842 by the Society of Jesus (better known as the Jesuits), and has buildings designed by notable architects such as Joseph Hansom, Henry Clutter and Adrian Gilbert Scott. The school is a member of the Headmasters' and Headmistresses' Conference and the Catholic Independent Schools Conference.

Its affiliated preparatory school is Barlborough Hall School, just 2.2 miles down the road.

History

Foundation
Since 1580, during the English Reformation, there were Jesuits living and working in Spinkhill, serving the local Catholic population. In 1580, Robert Persons, Edmund Campion, and Ralph Emerson came to England in secret. These first Jesuits were sheltered at Spinkhill Hall, the house that became Mount St Mary's College. In 1620, a clandestine school was founded in Stanley Grange near Derby. When this school was discovered and dispersed by the authorities, it did not cease to exist. It was moved to Spinkhill. The school was in buildings owned by members of the Pole family who were related to those living at nearby Radbourne Hall. During the 1700s, it was recorded that there was a Catholic chapel in Spinkhill, a house for Jesuit priests and that they travelled to serve the Catholics in Holbeck, Nottinghamshire.

Construction
In 1842, after Catholic emancipation, Mount St Mary's College was founded. It was originally called the College of the Immaculate Conception at Spinkhill and it was founded by Fr Randall Lythgoe, the provincial superior of the Jesuits in Britain at the time. Some of the college buildings date from the 16th and 17th centuries. The oldest part of the college is the Sodality Chapel. After soldiers of Charles II raided a Jesuit college in Holbeck Woodhouse, furnishings from that college were taken to Spinkhill. In 1840, the first buildings built for the college were designed by Joseph Hansom. In 1850, the Hopkins wing (girls) was built. In 1876, construction started on the new college building. It was designed by Henry Clutton. It was completed in 1912. The Memorial Chapel was designed by Adrian Gilbert Scott, and was completed in 1924. It is a memorial to at least 100 former pupils killed in the Second Boer War, World War I, and World War II and it is a Grade II listed building.

Developments
In 1939, Barlborough Hall, an Elizabethan manor some two miles from Spinkhill, was acquired to serve as a preparatory school to Mount St Mary's College. On 16 July 1939, the then headmaster, Fr Ralph Baines successfully petitioned the College of Arms to give the college its own coat of arms. This is still used by the college today. During Baines' Headmastership from 1939 to 1945, he was also accepted into the Headmasters' and Headmistresses' Conference, thus establishing the college as a Public School. In 1979, girls were admitted as day students. From 1984, girls began boarding in the school.

In September 2006, Mount St Mary's became its own charitable trust. The Society of Jesus transferred the two schools to the Mount St Mary's Trust. While legally separate from the Jesuits, the college still works with them to maintain the Jesuit mission and identity of the college.

Coat of arms

School years

Each of the school years are named after different stages of elementary skills, taken from the Jesuit text, Ratio Studiorum:
 Upper Elements (Year 7)
 Figures (Year 8)
 Rudiments (Year 9)
 Grammar (Year 10)
 Syntax (Year 11)
 Poetry (Lower Sixth—Year 12)
 Rhetoric (Upper Sixth—Year 13)

The school is split into three houses, Loyola named after Ignatius of Loyola, Xavier named after Francis Xavier, and Campion named after Edmund Campion. For each year, there are three forms and each form applies to one of the schools houses.

Facilities and sport

The college takes part in sports, notably rugby, and some of its older students have joined the England Rugby teams along with Scotland, Ireland, Italy, and many other countries. The school also receives rugby honours, winning the NatWest Schools Cup in 1994, after being runners up in 1992. The college repeated this honour, winning the U18 National School's Vase in 2022. The college also won the National Schools Sevens four times from 1988 to 1995. There is a sporting rivalry against fellow Catholic Public Schools, Stonyhurst College and Ampleforth College.

Mount St Mary's Combined Cadet Force (CCF) is over 100 years old. Pupils in Year 10 upwards can join either the Army or (since 1984) the RAF section. According to the Independent Schools Inspectorate, "The school's RAF cadet force became the first nationwide to achieve their 'blue wings' gliding license," and "pupils achieve high success rates in the Duke of Edinburgh award at all levels." The college has music and drama departments that work together for productions. The college's art department includes design and technology, fashion, fine art, and photography. The college has had exchanges with Notre Dame St Sigisbert in Nancy, France, and with Col·legi Casp and Joan 23 schools in Barcelona. In 2009, the college began an exchange with St. Michel in Saint-Étienne, France and considers Lycée Notre-Dame Saint-Sigisbert a sister school. The college also holds fund-raising events for the Chikuni Mission in Zambia.

The college has a Grade 1 Athletics Stadium, which was selected as a Pre-Games Training Camp for the London 2012 Summer Olympics. There are also nine rugby pitches, three cricket squares, an astro-turf, two sports halls, and a leisure centre with indoor swimming pool, cardio room, and two weights rooms. The latter is open to the public for use at specific times and is run by Nuffield Health. There is a Sixth Form Centre, and a programme of speakers coming from outside the college. The boarding community comprises UK and international pupils who choose to board either full-time, on a weekly or flexi basis.

Notable alumni

Old boys (or alumni) are known as "Mountaineers".
 Archie Butterworth, inventor and racing driver
 Tony Brooks, former racing driver, known as the 'racing dentist'
 John Butler-Bowdon, 25th Baron Grey de Ruthyn, British peer
 Sir Paget Bourke, Irish barrister and British colonial judge
 Aston Chichester, first Roman Catholic Archbishop of Salisbury, Zimbabwe
 Fred Dewhurst Preston North End footballer of the 1880s and 1890s
 Emmanuel Berchmans Devlin KC, Canadian lawyer and politician
 Alfred Martin Duggan-Cronin, Irish-born South African photographer
 Vincent Esch, British architect
 Sir Denis Henry, 1st Baronet, Lord Chief Justice of Northern Ireland
 Michael Hills, rugby player
 Gerard W. Hughes, Jesuit priest and writer
 David Jennings, composer
 Paul Lindley, entrepreneur and founder of Ella's Kitchen
 Hugh Lofting, author, creator of Doctor Dolittle (attended the college 1894–1904)
 Brendan McGuinness, British Army officer
 Sir Martin Melvin, 1st Baronet
 Kevin O'Shiel, Irish politician and civil servant
 Steve Perez, entrepreneur and rally driver
 Francis Petre, New Zealand architect
 Henry Petre DSO MC, solicitor and founding member of the Australian Flying Corps
 Carlos Reygadas, film director
 Sir David Rose, former Governor-General of Guyana
 Joe Tetley, cricketer
 John Wheatley, Lord Wheatley

Notable staff

 Sir Norman Adsetts OBE, businessman who sits on the chair of governors
 Harold Cartwright, cricketer who taught cricket and mathematics
 James Cullen, mathematician, taught mathematics at the school
 Paul Fisher, cricketer and classicist who was Headmaster at the school
 Gerard Manley Hopkins, poet, taught at the school from 1877 to 1878.
 Lesroy Weekes, first-class cricketer, current Head of Cricket

See also
 Church of the Immaculate Conception, Spinkhill
 List of Jesuit sites in the United Kingdom
 List of Jesuit schools

References

Further reading
 Peter McArdle, The Story of Barlborough Hall: With a Short Account of Its Parent College Mount St Mary's College, Spinkhill, 1979.

External links

 
 Profile on the Independent Schools Council website
 Independent Schools Inspectorate Inspection Reports
  Charity Overview (Registered Charity No.)

1842 establishments in England
Boarding schools in Derbyshire
Catholic boarding schools in England
Educational institutions established in 1842
Private schools in Derbyshire
Jesuit secondary schools in England
Jesuit universities and colleges in England
Member schools of the Headmasters' and Headmistresses' Conference
Roman Catholic private schools in the Diocese of Hallam

Eckington, Derbyshire
Grade II listed buildings in Derbyshire
Henry Clutton buildings
Buildings by Joseph Hansom
Adrian Gilbert Scott buildings